Leonardo "Léo" Navacchio (born 28 December 1992) is a Brazilian football player who plays in Portugal for Torreense.

Club career
He made his professional debut in the Segunda Liga for Portimonense on 2 April 2016 in a game against Leixões.

On 10 August 2022, Navacchio signed with Torreense.

References

1992 births
Footballers from São Paulo (state)
Living people
Brazilian footballers
Association football goalkeepers
São Paulo FC players
Sertãozinho Futebol Clube players
Oeste Futebol Clube players
América Futebol Clube (RN) players
Portimonense S.C. players
F.C. Penafiel players
S.C. Covilhã players
S.C.U. Torreense players
Primeira Liga players
Liga Portugal 2 players
Brazilian expatriate footballers
Expatriate footballers in Portugal
Brazilian expatriate sportspeople in Portugal